Kahnuj (also Romanized as Kahnūj) is a city and capital of Kahnuj County, Kerman Province, Iran.  At the 2006 census, its population was 38,571, in 8,278 families.  To the northwest is Mehroyeh Wildlife Refuge.

Climate

References

Populated places in Kahnuj County
Cities in Kerman Province